Maraton is the debut studio album from Swedish singer Alina Devecerski who had huge success with the debut single "Flytta på dej!", a prerelease from the album. The single reached number one in Sweden, Norway and Denmark.

Track listing

Charts

References

2012 debut albums
Swedish-language albums
Synth-pop albums by Swedish artists